Operation Jackstay was a joint U.S. Marine Corps, U.S. Navy, U.S. Coast Guard and Republic of Vietnam Marine Division operation in the Rung Sat Special Zone, South Vietnam that took place from 26 March to 6 April 1966.

Background
Military Assistance Command, Vietnam (MACV) decided that a large-scale amphibious raid in the area would be necessary to ease VC pressure on the shipping channel.

Phase 2 would see the Marines moved deeper into the zone. The planners realized that such a small assault force could not eradicate the VC in the zone and the operation was only intended to disrupt VC operations and demonstrate that the Allies could penetrate their safe havens.

Operation
The operation began on the morning of 26 March with a preliminary bombardment by Robison and aircraft from Hancock. A Marine company then landed from surface craft near Dong Hoa on the western end of the peninsula. Two companies were then landed on the center and eastern end of the peninsula by helicopter encountering only scattered sniper fire. During the first night 21 four–man night observation posts were established. The VC attacked one position with grenades killing 2 Marines and starting a brief firefight that resulted in 3 VC killed.

On 28 March the Marines landed unopposed on the Soài Rạp River. The landing was unopposed and the Marines discovered a VC weapons cache with 18 carbines and 1,000 grenades.

Over the following days the U.S. Marines and South Vietnamese Marines conducted three further amphibious assaults into the zone uncovering VC base areas and supplies, but without meeting any serious resistance.

Aftermath
Operation Jackstay concluded on 6 April. 63 Viet Cong and 5 U.S. personnel were killed in the operation. The Marines discovered and destroyed Viet Cong arms factories, training camps, a headquarters complex, and a hospital. Large amounts of rice and supplies were captured, including 60,000 rounds of ammunition and 300 pounds of gunpowder.

The operation was regarded as a success in that it disrupted the VC infrastructure in the area and there was a noticeable decline in VC activity throughout the zone following the operation.

Notes

Battles and operations of the Vietnam War
United States Marine Corps in the Vietnam War
Battles and operations of the Vietnam War in 1966
History of Ho Chi Minh City